The Prime Minister of Bangladesh, officially Prime Minister of the People's Republic of Bangladesh is the chief executive of the government of Bangladesh. The Prime Minister and the Cabinet are collectively accountable for their policies and actions to the Parliament, to their political party and ultimately to the electorate. The Prime Minister is ceremonially appointed by the President of Bangladesh.

The position was taken over by the military during years of 1975–78, 1982-86 and 1990-91 due to imposed martial law. In each of these periods, the national government leadership was in control of the military with the executive authority of the President and the Prime Minister. During the period between 1996 and 2008, The Chief Adviser of the Caretaker Government of the People's Republic of Bangladesh exercised authority as per the constitution as the Head of government for 90 days during transition between one elected government to another. The Chief Adviser headed an Advisory Committee comprising ten Advisers. With powers roughly equivalent to those of the Prime Minister of an elected governments, his executive power was constrained with certain constitutional limitations. The system was scrapped in 2011 by 15th amendment of constitution to allow political government to conduct any General Election in future.

The current prime minister, Sheikh Hasina, was appointed on 6 January 2009 by the President of Bangladesh, and she is also the longest serving prime minister in the country and still is.

Appointment
According to the Constitution, the prime minister is appointed by the President based upon the result of the electorates choice in parliamentary general election held by the Election Commission. The Prime Minister will be the leader of the majority party (or coalition) in the Jatiya Sangsad and must have the confidence of the Jatiya Sangsad to govern. The cabinet is composed of ministers selected by the prime minister and appointed by the president. At least 90% of the ministers must be MPs. The other 10% may be non-MP experts or "technocrats" who are not otherwise disqualified from being elected MPs. According to the constitution, the president can dissolve Parliament upon the written request of the prime minister. The appointments of the Prime Minister and other Ministers of state and deputy Ministers, shall be made by the President:
Provided that not less the nine tenths of their number shall be appointed from among members of parliament and not more than one tenth of their number may be chosen from among persons qualified for election as members of parliament.

Eligibility

Oath
The Prime Minister is appointed and sworn in by the President:

Bangla

" আমি, (নাম),  সশ্রদ্ধচিত্তে শপথ (বা দৃঢ়ভাবে ঘোষণা) করিতেছি যে, আমি আইন-অনুযায়ী সরকারের প্রধানমন্ত্রী (কিংবা ক্ষেত্রমত মন্ত্রী, প্রতি-মন্ত্রী, বা উপমন্ত্রী)-পদের কর্তব্য বিশ্বস্ততার সহিত পালন করিব: আমি বাংলাদেশের প্রতি অকৃত্রিম বিশ্বাস ও আনুগত্য পোষণ করিব; আমি সংবিধানের রক্ষণ, সমর্থন ও নিরাপত্তাবিধান করিব; এবং আমি ভীতি বা অনুগ্রহ, অনুরাগ বা বিরাগের বশবর্তী না হইয়া সকলের প্রতি আইন-অনুযায়ী যথাবিহীত আচরণ করিব।”

English

In English, "I, (name) do swear with honor (or solemnly affirm) that I, according to the laws, shall faithfully discharge the functions of the office of the Prime Minister (or Minister or State Minister or Sub-minister, as the circumstances allow). I shall possess pure faith and obedience to Bangladesh. I shall preserve, support and secure the constitution and I shall deal with all with equity as suggested by laws, without being affected by fear or mercy, love or hatred."

Duties of the office 

The office of the Prime Minister is located at Tejgaon in Dhaka city. It is considered a ministry of the government and among other duties, provides clerical, security, and other support to the prime minister, governs intelligence affairs, NGOs, and arranges protocol and ceremonies.

Leader of the House

The Leader of the House is responsible for managing and scheduling Government business in the Jatiya Sangsad. The office is always held by Prime Minister of Bangladesh.

Minister for Cabinet Affairs

Minister of Defence

Minister of Energy

Chairperson of the Planning Commission

History and timeline

Origin 
Bangladesh origins lie in Bengal, a province of the British India that included present-day West Bengal. Between 1937 and 1947 it was intermittently governed by a popularly elected ministry, whose head is often designated the Premier of Bengal. In 1947, Bengal province was partitioned into the Indian state of West Bengal and East Pakistan. All three erstwhile Bengal premiers—A. K. Fazlul Huq, Khawaja Nazimuddin and H. S. Suhrawardy—became Pakistani citizens; the latter two went on to become Prime Ministers of Pakistan in the 1950s.

East Pakistan's history from 1947 to 1971 was marked by political instability and economic difficulties. The nascent democratic institutions foundered in the face of military intervention in 1958, and the government imposed martial law between 1958 and 1962, and again between 1969 and 1971. Between 1947 and 1971 it was intermittently governed by Governors and Chief Minister of East Pakistan.

The modern office of Prime Minister was established following the declaration of independence of East Pakistan with the Provisional Government of Bangladesh on 17 April 1971, of which Tajuddin Ahmad became the first Prime Minister of Bangladesh. Since the adoption of the current Constitution of Bangladesh in 1972 the formal title of the office is The Prime Minister of the People's Republic of Bangladesh.

Military coups and presidential regimes (1975-1991) 
From 1975 to 1991, the Prime Minister was appointed by the President while the President had executive power.

Return of parliamentary government 
In September 1991, the electorate approved changes to the constitution, formally creating a parliamentary system and returning governing power to the office of the prime minister, as in Bangladesh's original constitution. In October 1991, members of parliament elected a new head of state, President Abdur Rahman Biswas.

Hasina-Khaleda rivalry (1991-present)
For more than three decades, Bangladeshi politics have been dominated by Khaleda Zia and Sheikh Hasina. They have been the only people to serve as non-interim Prime Minister since 1991.

Khaleda Zia (BNP) (1991-1996, 2001-2006)
Khaleda Zia served as Prime Minister of Bangladesh twice from 1991 to 1996 and from 2001 to 2006.
Once in power, Khaleda Zia's government made substantial changes in education policy, introducing free education for girls up to the 10th grade, a stipend for female students, and food for education programme funds. It also made highest budgetary allocation in the education sector.

She became Prime Minister for the second consecutive term after the BNP had a landslide victory on 15 February 1996 general election to the sixth Jatiya Sangsad which is widely believed to be rigged voting after bribeing the election commissioner. The election was, however, boycotted by all other major parties who were demanding that the elections be held under a neutral caretaker government, following allegations of rigging in a by-election held in 1994. Turnout was estimated at around 5%, though the government at the time claimed it to be much higher. On 12 June 1996 polls, BNP lost to Hasina's Awami League but emerged as the largest opposition party in the country's parliamentary history with 116 seats.

Aiming to return to power, the BNP formed a four-party alliance on 6 January 1999 with its former political opinion Jatiya Party, and the Islamic party of Jamaat-e-Islami Bangladesh and the Islami Oikya Jot and launched several agitation programmes against the ruling Awami League. In the 2001 general elections BNP won the election with a two-thirds majority of seats in parliament and 46% of the vote (compared to the principal opposition party's 40%) and Khaleda Zia was once again sworn in as the Prime Minister of Bangladesh.

In 2008 election, they faced a landslide defeat. Khaleda led four-party alliance won only 32 seats and emerged as the smallest opposition party in the country's parliamentary history. They won only 32% of the total vote where their main rival Awami League won more than 50% of the total vote.

In the Tenth Jatiyo Sangsad election of 2014, the BNP along with its 18 party alliance boycotted and violently protested the election to no avail.

Sheikh Hasina (1996-2001, 2009-present)
Sheika Hasina lost to Khaleda Zia in 1991 parliamentary election after managing to win 88 seats and her party sat in opposition benches. She boycotted the 1996 February 15 elections giving Khaleda Zia a default victory.

Awami League won 146 seats in the 1996 June 12 parliamentary elections. The support of the Jatiya Party and a few independent candidates were enough for the 150 or more seats needed for the required majority. Hasina took the oath as the prime minister of Bangladesh. She vowed to create a Government of National Unity. Though some smaller parties and a few individuals from BNP did join the government, the distance between the main two political parties as well as their leaders remained as large as ever.

Awami League was defeated in the 2001 Parliament election. It won only 62 seats in the Parliament, while the Four-Party Alliance led by the Bangladesh Nationalist Party won more than 200 seats, giving them a two-thirds majority in the Parliament. Hasina herself was defeated from a constituency in Rangpur, which happened to contain her husband's hometown, but won from three other seats. Sheikh Hasina and the Awami League rejected the results, claiming that the election was rigged with the help of the President and the Caretaker government. However, the international community was largely satisfied with the elections and the Four-Party Alliance went on to form the government.

In the December 2008 election, Sheikh Hasina led Awami league got a landslide victory winning 230 seats, which gave them the two-thirds majority in the parliament. She made an alliance with JP and left fronts and her grand alliance won 252 seats in the parliament. Sheikh Hasina took oath as Prime Minister on 6 January 2009. She is still the prime minister of Bangladesh after winning a walkover 5 January 2014 election when Khaleda Zia's BNP boycotted the general election.

Sheikh Hasina secured a fourth term as prime minister after winning the 2018 general election. Hasina have become the longest served Prime Minister of Bangladesh since independence.

2007 political crisis and caretaker government

The scheduled 22 January 2007 elections were marred by controversy. The Awami League and its allies protested, saying that the elections would not be fair because of alleged bias by the caretaker government in favour of Khaleda Zia and the BNP. Hasina demanded that the head of the caretaker government, President Iajuddin Ahmed, step down from that position, and on 3 January 2007, she announced that the Awami League and its allies would boycott the elections. Later in the month, the military led by Army Chief General Moinuddin Ahmed intervened and President Iajuddin Ahmed was asked to resign as the Chief Advisor. He was also made to declare a state of emergency. A new military-controlled Caretaker government was formed with Dr. Fakhruddin Ahmed as the Chief Adviser. The scheduled parliamentary election was postponed.

On 12 January 2007, President Iajuddin Ahmed swore in Fakhruddin Ahmed as the Chief Adviser to the Interim Caretaker Government. For a country widely perceived as one of the world's most corrupt, the most dramatic aspect of Fakhruddin Ahmed's rule is his antigraft campaign against the establishment. So far, more than 160 senior politicians, top civil servants and security officials have been arrested on suspicion of graft and other economic crimes. The roundup has netted former ministers from the two main political parties, including former prime ministers Khaleda Zia and Sheikh Hasina and former adviser Fazlul Haque.

On May 11, 2017, the Office of Bangladesh Prime Minister Hasina Wazed announced that then US Secretary of State Hillary Clinton called her office in March 2011 to demand that Dr. Muhammed Yunus, a 2006 Nobel Peace prize winner, be restored to his role as chairman of microcredit bank, Grameen Bank. The bank's nonprofit Grameen America, which Yunus chairs, has given between $100,000 and $250,000 to the Clinton Global Initiative. Grameen Research, which is chaired by Yunus, has donated between $25,000 and $50,000, according to the Clinton Foundation website.

Salary and allowance
According to The Prime Minister's (Remuneration and Privilege) (Amendment) Bill, 2016, the salary of the Prime Minister of Bangladesh is one lakh 15 thousand Taka per month. Besides, he gets a monthly house rent of one lakh Taka and a daily allowance of three thousand Taka.

List of prime ministers

See also 
 President of Bangladesh
 Prime Minister of Bengal
 Deputy Prime Minister of Bangladesh
 Foreign Minister of Bangladesh
 Caretaker government
 Politics of Bangladesh
 Constitution of Bangladesh

References 

Politics of Bangladesh
Government of Bangladesh
 
1971 establishments in Bangladesh

dv:ބަންގާޅުގެ ބޮޑުވަޒީރު
fr:Premiers ministres du Bangladesh
id:Daftar Perdana Menteri Bangladesh
zh:孟加拉国总理